The United States Circuit Court of the District of Columbia (in case citations, C.C.D.C.) was a United States federal court which existed from 1801 to 1863. The court was created by the District of Columbia Organic Act of 1801.

History
The D.C. circuit court was not one of the United States circuit courts established by the Judiciary Act of 1789. The Circuit Court of the District of Columbia was established on February 27, 1801 by the District of Columbia Organic Act of 1801, 2 Stat. 103, which authorized one chief judge and two assistant judges who were to serve during good behavior. Congress granted the court the same powers as the U.S. circuit courts as well as local civil and criminal jurisdiction within the District of Columbia. On March 3, 1801, by 2 Stat. 123, Congress authorized the chief judge of the Circuit Court of the District of Columbia to hold the United States District Court for the District of Potomac, but this jurisdiction was short lived. On March 8, 1802, by 2 Stat. 132, the Potomac District was abolished, effective July 1, 1802. Shortly thereafter, on April 29, 1802, by 2 Stat. 156, the Judiciary Act of 1802 established the United States District Court for the District of Columbia and specified that the court would have the same jurisdiction and powers as the U.S. district courts. The act authorized the chief judge of the Circuit Court of the District of Columbia to preside in the district court.

Congress established the Criminal Court of the District of Columbia on July 7, 1838, by 5 Stat. 306. This act authorized one judge, and granted the Criminal Court the powers of the U.S. circuit courts and the Circuit Court of the District of Columbia in criminal matters. The act of February 20, 1839, 5 Stat. 319, provided that the chief judge of the Circuit Court of the District of Columbia would preside in the absence of the Criminal Court judge. On July 9, 1846, by 9 Stat. 35, The county of Alexandria in the District of Columbia was returned to the state of Virginia, and the division of the Circuit Court of the District of Columbia seated in that county was abolished upon the formal approval of retrocession, occurred September 7, 1846.

The circuit court, district court, and criminal court of the District of Columbia were finally abolished altogether on March 3, 1863, by 12 Stat. 762. A new court, the Supreme Court of the District of Columbia (later renamed the "United States District Court for the District of Columbia"), was created in its place, thus terminating the service of the three U.S. circuit court judges appointed to serve during good behavior.

Judges of the D.C. Circuit

Notes

Further reading
James M. O'Fallon, The Case of Benjamin More: A Lost Episode in the Struggle over Repeal of the 1801 Judiciary Act, 11  43 (1993).
John G. Roberts, Jr., What Makes the D.C. Circuit Different?: A Historical View, 92  375 (2006).

External links
Federal Courts of the District of Columbia from the Federal Judicial Center

Defunct United States courts
1801 establishments in Washington, D.C.
1863 disestablishments in Washington, D.C.
Courts and tribunals established in 1801
Courts and tribunals disestablished in 1963